Adolphe Stoeber, or Adolf Stöber (Strasbourg, 1810 – Mulhouse, 1892) was a French ecclesiastic and writer in German language from Alsace.

He was Ehrenfried Stoeber's son and Auguste Stoeber's brother. He studied theology and was a Protestant priest in Metz (1832), Oberbronn (1836) and Mulhouse, where he was president at the Reformist Assembly.

In 1838, he founded the publication Erwinia with his brother. This magazine dealt with Alsatian and Swiss legends in Alsatian.

Works 
 Alsatisches Vergißmeinnicht (1825)
 Alsa-Bilder (1836)
 Reisebilder aus der Schweiz (1850)
 Elsässer Schatzkästel  (1877)
 Epheukranz auf das Grabmal einer Heimgegangenen (1884)
 Spiegel deutscher Frauen (1892)

1810 births
1892 deaths
French writers in German
Writers  from Strasbourg
French male writers
Clergy from Strasbourg